Sibogasyrinx is a genus of sea snails, marine gastropod mollusks in the family Cochlespiridae.

Previously it was considered a subgenus of Leucosyrinx Dall, 1889 in the family Pseudomelatomidae..

Species
Species within the genus Sibogasyrinx include:
 Sibogasyrinx archibenthalis (Powell, 1969) 
 Sibogasyrinx clausura Kantor & Puillandre, 2021
 Sibogasyrinx elbakyanae Kantor, Puillandre & Bouchet, 2021
 Sibogasyrinx filosa Ardovini, 2021
 Sibogasyrinx lolae Kantor & Puillandre, 2021
 Sibogasyrinx maximei Kantor & Puillandre, 2021
 Sibogasyrinx pagodiformis Kantor & Puillandre, 2021
 Sibogasyrinx pyramidalis (Schepman, 1913)
 Sibogasyrinx sangeri Kantor, Fedosov & Puillandre, 2018
 Sibogasyrinx subula Kantor & Puillandre, 2021
Synonyms
 Sibogasyrinx filosus Ardovini, 2021: synonym of Sibogasyrinx filosa Ardovini, 2021 (wrong gender agreement of specific epithet)

References

External links
 Powell, A. W. B. (1969). The family Turridae in the Indo-Pacific. Part 2. The subfamily Turriculinae. Indo-Pacific Mollusca. 2 (10): 215-416
 Kantor, Y.I. & Puillandre, N. (2021). Rare, deep-water and similar: revision of Sibogasyrinx (Conoidea: Cochlespiridae). European Journal of Taxonomy. 773: 19-60.